Aribert Mog (3 August 1904 – 2 October 1941) was a German film actor who played in a mixture of leading and supporting roles during the 1930s. He was a member of the Militant League for German Culture and the National Socialist Factory Cell Organization. In May 1940 he was called up for military service and died fighting on the Eastern Front with the Infantry Regiment 9 Potsdam the following year.

Selected filmography
 Fight of the Tertia (1929)
 The Brandenburg Arch (1929)
 The Call of the North (1929)
 Scapa Flow (1930)
 Farewell (1930)
 Westfront 1918 (1930)
 Kinder vor Gericht (1931)
 The Trunks of Mr. O.F. (1931)
 Louise, Queen of Prussia (1931)
 The Leap into the Void (1932)
 Girls of Today (1933)
 Ekstase (1933)
 Must We Get Divorced? (1933)
 Regine (1935)
 Fährmann Maria (1936)
 The Unknown (1936)
 Ewiger Wald (1936)
 Der Etappenhase (1937)
 Carousel (1937)
 Travelling People (1938)
 The Curtain Falls (1939)
 The Fox of Glenarvon (1940)
 Wunschkonzert (1940)

Bibliography

External links

1904 births
1941 deaths
Male actors from Berlin
German male film actors
German male silent film actors
Militant League for German Culture members
20th-century German male actors
German Army personnel killed in World War II
20th-century Freikorps personnel
Nazi Party members
German Army soldiers of World War II
Military personnel from Berlin